The Original SoundTrack Album of Project Polaroid is the studio album by American hip hop duo Project Polaroid, composed of New York rapper Kool Keith and Bay Area producer TomC3. It was released worldwide on April 25, 2006 via Threshold Recordings and on June 28, 2006 in Japan via Swamp Records. Audio production of the project was entirely handled by TomC3, and featured guest appearances from Organized Konfusion's Prince Po, Masters of Illusion's Motion Man, and Third Sight's Roughneck Jihad.

Track listing

Personnel
Keith Matthew Thornton – main artist, vocals
Tom Cleary – main artist, producer, recording, mixing
Raggedy Andy – recording, design, layout, photography
David Cheppa – mastering
Nadjib Boulaone – scratches
Lawrence Baskerville – featured artist (track 4)
Paul K. Laster – featured artist (track 8)
Roughneck Jihad – featured artist (track 12)

Release history

References

External links

2006 albums
Kool Keith albums